Stephen Sewall (1702–1760), was a judge in colonial Massachusetts.

Stephen Sewall may also refer to:

 Stephen Sewall (academic) (1734–1804), American professor

See also 
 Stephen Sewell (disambiguation)